Ana Pelegrín (1938–2008) was an Argentine researcher, writer, and educator.  She was considered one of the leading specialists on Hispanic literature and oral tradition of poetry.

Argentine women writers
People from Jujuy Province
1938 births
2008 deaths